Clematis linearifolia is a vine in the Ranunculaceae family, endemic to south-west Western Australia.

It was first described in 1845 by Ernst von Steudel, from a specimen collected on Rottnest Island on 18 July 1839.

Description
It is a dioecious woody climber growing up to 5 m tall.

References

External links 

 Clematis linearifolia occurrence data from the Australasian Virtual Herbarium

linearifolia
Flora of Western Australia
Plants described in 1845
Taxa named by Ernst Gottlieb von Steudel
Dioecious plants